Masitinib is a tyrosine-kinase inhibitor used in the treatment of mast cell tumours in animals, specifically dogs. Since its introduction in November 2008 it has been distributed under the commercial name Masivet. It has been available in Europe since the second part of 2009. Masitinib has been studied for several human conditions including melanoma, multiple myeloma, gastrointestinal cancer, pancreatic cancer, Alzheimer disease, multiple sclerosis, rheumatoid arthritis, mastocytosis, amyotrophic lateral sclerosis and COVID-19.

Mechanism of action
Masitinib is a tyrosine kinase inhibitor which inhibits tyrosine kinases, enzymes responsible for the activation of many proteins by signal transduction cascades. Specifically, masitinib targets the receptor tyrosine kinase c-Kit which is found to be overexpressed or mutated in several types of cancer. Masitinib is also additional targets, it also inhibits the platelet derived growth factor receptor (PDGFR), lymphocyte-specific protein tyrosine kinase (Lck), focal adhesion kinase (FAK) and fibroblast growth factor receptor 3 (FGFR3) as well as CSF1R.

Masitinib has been shown to block the replication of SARS-CoV-2 by inhibiting its main protease, 3CLpro. Masitinib showed >200-fold reduction in viral titers in the lungs and nose of mice infected with SARS-CoV-2.

Clinical use 

Masitinib was under investigation for the treatment of systemic mastocytosis (Masipro) but approval was denied in the EU in 2017 due to concerns "about the reliability of the study results" and major changes to the study design.

European approval of masitinib for treatment of amyotrophic lateral sclerosis (Alsitek) was also refused in 2018.

References 

Veterinary drugs
Tyrosine kinase inhibitors
3-Pyridyl compounds